Joseph E. Vogler (April 24, 1913 – ) was the founder of the Alaskan Independence Party. He was also chair or gubernatorial nominee during most of the party's existence. He was also known, originally in his adopted hometown of Fairbanks, Alaska, and later statewide, as a frequent participant in governmental and political affairs and frequent litigant in court. Curiously enough, he was known to many non-political observers for his fashion sense, in particular his ubiquitous wearing of fedoras and bolo ties.

Early life

Vogler was born April 24, 1913, on a farm outside Barnes, Kansas. He graduated from high school in Waterville, Kansas, in 1929. That year, he began studying at the University of Kansas on a scholarship. He graduated with a law degree in five years and was admitted to the Kansas State Bar.

Vogler moved to Alaska in March 1942, having run afoul of many of his contemporaries in the Lower 48 regarding his views on then-U.S. President Franklin D. Roosevelt. After spending a year in Kodiak, he moved to Fairbanks and worked as a civilian employee of the U.S. Army Corps of Engineers at Ladd Field (now Fort Wainwright) in Fairbanks, until 1951 when he began mining on Homestake Creek. Vogler spent fifty years as a miner and developer in Alaska.

Vogler was known around Fairbanks as a frequent writer of letters to the editor until 1973 when he launched a petition drive calling for Alaska to secede. He subsequently launched his first campaign for governor a year later. He gained his first serious notoriety in Fairbanks during the 1940s and 1950s for a feud with Paul and Flora Greimann, operators of University Bus Lines. The company was a private urban transit company, which primarily transported students between Fairbanks and the University of Alaska.

Prior to the replacement of the Cushman Street Bridge in 1959, the old bridge was too narrow to accommodate both a large vehicle such as a truck or bus, and another vehicle. Vogler, with Warren A. Taylor as his attorney, sued University Bus Lines in 1948 in what the Fairbanks Daily News-Miner at the time called the "Battle of the Bridge". Vogler sought a permanent injunction against the buses straddling the center rail of the bridge. The feud continued after the Wendell Street Bridge opened in 1953 and Greimann's buses continued using the Cushman bridge instead of the newer, wider bridge. Police were often involved in quelling these confrontations.

Political career

Vogler arose as a figure in Alaskan politics in 1973, where he began a petition calling for secession of Alaska from the United States. Alaska magazine reported that Vogler claimed to have gathered 15,000 signatures over a period of about three weeks. Vogler was quoted as saying about the effort: "The response has been beyond my wildest expectations. I never dreamed the people would respond like this."

During the 1970s, Vogler founded the Alaskan Independence Party (AIP) and Alaskans For Independence. The latter name was originally used to label the 1973 petition drive. Vogler also claimed to have organized the meeting which led to the formation of the Alaska Libertarian Party. The AIP and AFI, as Vogler explained, were intended to function as strictly separate entities—AIP was primarily to explore whether the 1958 vote by Alaskans authorizing statehood was legal, and AFI was primarily to actively pursue secession for Alaska from the United States.

The Alaskan Independence Party quotes Vogler as stating "I'm an Alaskan, not an American. I've got no use for America or her damned institutions."

In a 1991 interview currently housed at the Oral History Program in the Rasmuson Library at the University of Alaska, Fairbanks, Vogler is recorded as saying "The fires of hell are frozen glaciers compared to my hatred for the American government. And I won't be buried under their damn flag. I'll be buried in Dawson. And when Alaska is an independent nation they can bring my bones home."

Vogler would serve as the AIP's standard-bearer for most of the party's first two decades. He ran for governor in 1974, with Wayne Peppler (born March 26, 1942), a fellow miner from Fairbanks, as his running mate. Jay Hammond, a longtime legislator from the Bristol Bay region, was elected over incumbent governor Bill Egan by 287 votes, with Vogler trailing far behind. Many commentators described Vogler as a "spoiler" in the election, arguing that the result would have been different had he not been in the race. However, this campaign opened up the doors for non-major party candidates to run for major offices in Alaska, and generally this accusation is leveled during every election cycle.

Vogler switched to run for lieutenant governor in 1978, with Don Wright running for governor. Wright was also the AIP's nominee for governor from 2002 through 2010. The 1978 campaign for governor was dominated by the extremely controversial Republican primary race between moderate Hammond and former governor Walter Hickel. Hickel lost the primary by 98 votes and would launch a write-in campaign in the general election.

Hammond was reelected governor. There was also a well-financed independent candidate in the race, Tom Kelly, who was Commissioner of Natural Resources under Hickel and his successor, Keith Miller. There was little hope for the AIP ticket to gain much attention due to these factors. The Democratic nominee, Chancy Croft, placed third in the general election due to the continued interest in Hammond vs. Hickel beyond the primary election.

Vogler also ran for governor in 1982 and 1986. Several incidents during these campaigns raised his profile as a "colorful character." In the 1982 race, Vogler was taken to task for comments made during a debate. The issue of moving Alaska's capital appeared during the election, as it has on and off since 1960. The media and political pundits took great fun over Vogler's debate remarks that Alaska should "nuke the glaciers" along the coast of the Gulf of Alaska and build a freeway to Juneau. Vogler would later contend that these comments were misinterpreted. Vogler's running mate in 1982 was Roger "Dee" Roberts (born March 27, 1937). Roberts had previously been a candidate for state Senate in 1974 under the banner of the American Independent Party. His family have continued as political activists in Fairbanks to this day.

Vogler's running mate in 1986 was Al Rowe (born May 11, 1932), a Fairbanks resident and former Alaska State Trooper. Rowe took out a series of newspaper ads, fashioning himself in the image of Sheriff Buford Pusser. These ads were a major attention getter during the race. Between Rowe's ads and the turmoil existing in the Republican Party over the nomination of Arliss Sturgulewski, the AIP ticket was able to garner 5.5 percent of the vote, gaining the AIP status in Alaska as a recognized political party for the first time.

Vogler quit running for public office after the 1986 election. However, he would play a significant role in the next gubernatorial race. In 1990, as party chair, Vogler paved the way for the vacation of the nominated party ticket of John Lindauer and Jerry Ward and their replacement with Hickel and Jack Coghill. Coghill had been nominated as the lieutenant governor candidate by the Republican Party, but was dealing with serious compatibility and philosophical issues with gubernatorial nominee Sturgulewski. The ticket of Hickel and Coghill would go on to win the election.

Disappearance and death

Vogler disappeared under suspicious circumstances on May 30, 1993, just weeks before he was scheduled to give a speech to the United Nations on Alaskan independence, sponsored by the government of Iran.

Convicted thief Manfried West confessed to having murdered Vogler the following year in what he described as an illegal plastic explosive sale gone bad. West, trying to recant, later said the confession was a lie, but this was before Vogler's body had been discovered.

Vogler's remains were discovered in a gravel pit east of Fairbanks in October 1994 following an anonymous tip. He had been wrapped in a blue tarp secured with duct tape and was identified through fingerprint analysis. Manfried West was convicted of murdering Joe Vogler and sentenced to 80 years.

In the opinion of AIP Chair Lynette Clark and other AIP leaders, however, Vogler's death reflected more than a dispute with West. Clark has stated, "He was executed." She notes that Vogler was about to appear before the United Nations to address the issue of Alaskan independence, making the claim that "The United States government would have been deeply embarrassed. And we can't have that, can we?"

As he had publicly promised on numerous occasions, Vogler was buried in Dawson City, Yukon, Canada, fulfilling his wish that he not be buried under the American flag. His second wife, Doris Louise, who died of cancer in 1992, is buried next to him.

Legacy

Having graduated from law school, although never formally practicing law, Vogler nonetheless engaged in actions through the courts for most of his years in Fairbanks. These ranged from his dispute with Paul Griemann, through battling the Fairbanks North Star Borough over a great many issues in its earlier years, particularly regarding subdivisions he developed, to attempting to enforce subdivision covenants, to launching the earliest salvo in the fight for ballot access for minor parties in Alaska, through to his efforts regarding seeking formal recognition of his case on statehood issues.

Vogler had launched many political and secessionist efforts behind the scenes in addition to his more high-profile runs for office. Perhaps the best known of these was the lawsuit Vogler v. Miller in 1982, a ballot access case. Vogler v. Miller would be heavily cited in succeeding ballot access cases later in the decade, such as Sykes v. Alaska, which more directly widened ballot access and party recognition beyond the two major parties.

Vogler was noted for an antipathy toward aspens, to the point where he installed covenants in his subdivisions requiring homeowners to cut and destroy all poplar, cottonwood and aspen trees on a regular basis. This particular requirement would be challenged in court, with Vogler losing after a lengthy battle through the judicial system. The term "Voglerizer" has entered into the informal vernacular around the Fairbanks area to describe brush trimmers used on highway rights-of-way.

Interest in Vogler was briefly reignited during a period in the late 2000s (decade), when intense media scrutiny of Sarah Palin during her governorship and vice-presidential candidacy turned up a Palin family connection to the AIP. Other events of note happened during the same time period, though mostly particular to Fairbanks. Fairbanks-based singer-songwriter Caleb Aronson released his debut album, Livengood, in March 2006. The first track on Disc 2, "Moving Dirt," is a story song about Vogler's life and death. On July 7, 2006, Michael Feldman's Whad'Ya Know? broadcast live from the University of Alaska Fairbanks campus. Vogler's name was brought up during the broadcast, the mention eliciting a significant cheer from the audience. Also in 2006, the AIP released a compact disc entitled Joe Was Right! Volume 1. The disc consists of an interview given on KFAR's long-running Problem Corner talk show on October 18, 1982, during his second campaign for governor.

Personal life

Vogler had a daughter (Marilyn, born at St. Joseph's Hospital on April 6, 1945) and son (Joseph Jr., born c. 1947) by his first wife, but by all accounts (including his own), he had become estranged from this part of his family. Vogler met his second wife, Doris, in 1964 and remained with her until her death from cancer in 1992. Lynn Vogler, his nephew, was named the executor of his estate in a will he wrote following the death of Doris.

Previously unknown to his Fairbanks friends, Lynn arrived in Fairbanks shortly after his death and endured a contentious battle in Fairbanks during 1993 and 1994 amongst his friends, supporters and hangers-on over his legacy as well as his physical property. Lynn Vogler continues to the present as the executor of the estate.

See also

 Legal status of Alaska

Sources

 Election Candidate Pamphlet, State of Alaska, Office of the Lieutenant Governor, 1974
 Official Election Pamphlet, State of Alaska, Office of the Lieutenant Governor, 1978, 1982 and 1986
 Official Returns By Election Precinct, State of Alaska, Office of the Lieutenant Governor, 1974, 1978 and 1982
 Official Returns, State of Alaska, Office of the Lieutenant Governor, 1986
 "Like A Tree to the Soil": A History of Farming in the Tanana Valley, 1903 to 1940. Josephine E. Papp and Josie Phillips. UAF School of Natural Resources and Agricultural Sciences, 2007.

References

External links

 Project Jukebox: Joe Vogler. Interview by Margaret Van Cleve, March 29, 1991.
 Joe Vogler: In Memoriam. From the Alaskan Independence Party.
 Battle of Weber Creek, a 1985 documentary about Vogler

1913 births
1993 deaths
1993 murders in the United States
Alaskan Independence Party politicians
American miners
American real estate businesspeople
Burials in Canada
Businesspeople from Fairbanks, Alaska
Politicians from Fairbanks, Alaska
People from Marshall County, Kansas
People from Washington County, Kansas
People murdered in Alaska
Real estate and property developers
State political party chairs of Alaska
University of Kansas School of Law alumni
20th-century American businesspeople